Aco District may refer to:

 Aco District, Corongo, Peru
 Aco District, Concepción, Peru

District name disambiguation pages